was a town located in Shimotsuga District, Tochigi Prefecture, Japan.

As of 2003, the town had an estimated population of 17,373 and a density of 835.24 persons per km². The total area was 20.80 km².

On January 10, 2006, Kokubunji, along with the town of Minamikawachi (from Kawachi District), and the town of Ishibashi (also from Shimotsuga District), was merged to create the new city of Shimotsuke.

External links
 Shimotsuke official website 

Dissolved municipalities of Tochigi Prefecture
Shimotsuke, Tochigi